Nor-Aparan is a town in the Yerevan Province of Armenia.

References 

Populated places in Yerevan